Luteococcus japonicus is a Gram-positive and non-motile bacterium from the genus Luteococcus which has been isolated from soil in Japan.

References 

Propionibacteriales
Bacteria described in 1994